Gedling is a local government district with borough status in Nottinghamshire, England, whose council is based in Arnold, north-east of Nottingham. The population at the time of the 2011 census was 113,543.

It was formed on 1 April 1974 by merging the urban districts of Arnold and Carlton and part of the rural district of Basford. It is named after the village of Gedling. Other settlements include Burton Joyce, Calverton, Colwick and Ravenshead.

Description
The borough covers settlements which are heavily contiguous with Nottingham which include the towns of Arnold and Carlton. It also covers part of Mapperley and the rural villages of Calverton, Woodborough, Ravenshead and Newstead extending north towards Mansfield.

The Borough is one of contrasts: Arnold has a significant amount of council housing, whereas properties in the Newstead Abbey area of the borough often retail at between £1 million and £3 million. The area is split into an urban commuter base and rural farmland.

The Bonington Theatre in Arnold is named after the landscape painter Richard Parkes Bonington. The borough's most famous former resident is Lord Byron, who resided at Newstead Abbey.

In the older part of Gedling is All Hallows Anglican Church. It dates from the 11th century, with the oldest part of the church (the entrance) dating back to 1089. The Mary Hardstaff Homes were built on Arnold Lane in 1936.

Politics

Council

Gedling Borough Council is elected every four years, with 41 councillors being elected at each election. Labour has held a majority of the seats on the council since 2011, with John Clarke being leader of the council since then. The most recent election was in 2019 Gedling Borough Council election, and the next election is due in 2023. As at August 2022, the council comprises:

Parliamentary

The borough is covered by two parliamentary constituencies.  The more urban part of the borough adjoining Nottingham is in the Gedling constituency, which until 1983 was known as Carlton.  This was held by the Conservatives from its creation in 1950 until 1997 when it was taken by the Labour Party.  Vernon Coaker was the Member of Parliament from 1997 to 2019. In 2019 it was retaken by the Conservatives and Tom Randall became MP.

The rural part of the borough, including Calverton and Ravenshead, forms part of the Sherwood constituency, whose MP from 1992 to 2010 was Labour's Paddy Tipping. It is now is held by Mark Spencer, who won by 214 votes in the 2010 general election.   The constituency was created in 1983 and, as the area covered included many ex-mining areas, it was anticipated that it would be an easy target for Labour. However, Andy Stewart, a Conservative, won and held it until 1992. This is perceived to be because the majority of Nottinghamshire miners did not strike during the 1984-85 miners' strike and that the area also contains some of the most affluent areas in the county such as Ravenshead and Newstead Abbey Park.

Wards 
Calverton
Carlton
Carlton Hill
Cavendish
Colwick
Coppice
Daybrook
Dumbles
Ernehale
Gedling
Netherfield
Newstead Abbey
Phoenix
Plains
Porchester
Redhill
Trent Valley
Woodthorpe

Arms

Freedom of the Borough
The following people and military units have received the Freedom of the Borough of Gedling.

Individuals
 Rt Hon Lord Coaker: 17 June 2022.

Military Units
 2nd Battalion The Mercian Regiment: 20 October 2010.

References

External links

 
Non-metropolitan districts of Nottinghamshire
Boroughs in England